Janus was a feminist science fiction fanzine edited by Janice Bogstad and Jeanne Gomoll in Madison, Wisconsin, and closely associated with that city's science fiction convention, WisCon (several early WisCon program books doubled as special issues of Janus). It was repeatedly nominated for the Hugo Award for Best Fanzine (1978, 1979 and 1980); this led to accusations that if Janus had not been feminist, it wouldn't have been nominated. Eighteen issues were published under this name from 1975 to 1980; it was succeeded by Aurora SF (Aurora Speculative Feminism).

Contributors 
During its run, Janus included articles, reviews, artwork and/or letters of comment from a variety of notables, including: Amanda Bankier, Marion Zimmer Bradley, Walter Breen, Linda Bushyager, Avedon Carol, Suzy McKee Charnas, C. J. Cherryh, Buck Coulson, Samuel R. Delany, Gene DeWeese, Harlan Ellison, Alexis Gilliland, Mike Glicksohn, Joan Hanke-Woods, Teddy Harvia (both as Harvia and under his real name of David Thayer), Ursula K. Le Guin, Elizabeth Lynn, Loren MacGregor, Katherine Maclean, Vonda McIntyre, Alexei Panshin, Andy Porter, William Rotsler, Joanna Russ, Jessica Amanda Salmonson, Charles R. Saunders, Stu Shiffman, Gene Simmons, Wilson "Bob" Tucker, Joan Vinge, Harry Warner Jr., F. Paul Wilson, Donald A. Wollheim, and Susan Wood.

See also
 Feminist science fiction
 The Witch and the Chameleon
 Women in speculative fiction

References

External links
Janus/Aurora at The Encyclopedia of Science Fiction
Janus online
 

Defunct science fiction magazines published in the United States
Defunct women's magazines published in the United States
Feminist criticism
Feminist literature
Feminist magazines
Feminist science fiction
Magazines established in 1975
Magazines disestablished in 1980
Magazines published in Wisconsin
Mass media in Madison, Wisconsin
Science fiction fanzines